The Yamaka (Pali for "pairs") is a text of the Pali Canon, the scriptures of a Buddhist monk laws. It is a text on applied logic and analysis included in the Abhidhamma Pitaka.

Description
The Yamaka consists of ten chapters, each dealing with a particular topic of Buddhist doctrine: roots (mula), aggregates, elements (dhatu), and so on. Its title ('pairs') stems from its treatment of topics by way of a thesis and antithesis: Is all X Y? Does this imply that all Y is X?

The text's commentary treats the ten chapter headings as a mātikā, though no explicit matrix is presented in the text. A. K. Warder suggested that the text was a late addition to the Abhidhamma Pitaka, and represented an advanced text in applied logic meant to refine the knowledge of scholars already familiar with the Thervada abhidhamma system. In many places, the text considers the question of where and under what circumstances a being will be reborn given certain circumstances and levels of understanding.

References

External links
Pali text at suttacentral.net

Abhidhamma Pitaka